Didasys is a monotypic tiger moth genus in the family Erebidae. The genus contains the single species Didasys belae, the double-tufted wasp moth, which is found in the US states of Florida and Alabama. Both the genus and species were first described by Augustus Radcliffe Grote in 1875.

References

Euchromiina
Monotypic moth genera
Moths of North America